Lac-Ministuk is an unorganized territory in the Canadian province of Quebec, located in the regional county municipality of Le Fjord-du-Saguenay. The territory has a land area of 1,478 km2.

References

Unorganized territories in Saguenay–Lac-Saint-Jean